Bertram Neville Brockhouse,  (July 15, 1918 – October 13, 2003) was a Canadian physicist. He was awarded the Nobel Prize in Physics (1994, shared with Clifford Shull) "for pioneering contributions to the development of neutron scattering techniques for studies of condensed matter", in particular "for the development of neutron spectroscopy".

Education and early life
Brockhouse was born in Lethbridge, Alberta, and was a graduate of the University of British Columbia (BA, 1947) and the University of Toronto (MA, 1948; Ph.D, 1950).

Career and research
From 1950 to 1962, Brockhouse carried out research at Atomic Energy of Canada's Chalk River Nuclear Laboratory. Here he was joined by P. K. Iyengar, who is treated as the father of India's nuclear program.

In 1962, he became professor at McMaster University in Canada, where he remained until his retirement in 1984.

Brockhouse died on October 13, 2003 from Hamilton, Ontario at age of 85.

Awards and honours
Brockhouse was elected a Fellow of the Royal Society (FRS) in 1965. In 1982, Brockhouse was made an Officer of the Order of Canada and was promoted to Companion in 1995.

Brockhouse shared the 1994 Nobel Prize in Physics with American Clifford Shull of MIT for developing neutron scattering techniques for studying condensed matter.

In October 2005, as part of the 75th anniversary of McMaster University's establishment in Hamilton, Ontario, a street on the University campus (University Avenue) was renamed to Brockhouse Way in honour of Brockhouse. The town of Deep River, Ontario has also named a street in his honour.

The Nobel Prize that Bertram Brockhouse won (shared with Clifford Shull) in 1994 was awarded after the longest ever waiting time (counting from the time when the award-winning research had been carried out).

In 1999 the Division of Condensed Matter and Materials Physics (DCMMP) and the Canadian Association of Physicists (CAP) created a medal in honour of Brockhouse.  The medal is called the Brockhouse Medal and is awarded to recognize and encourage outstanding experimental or theoretical contributions to condensed matter and materials physics. This medal is awarded annually on the basis of outstanding experimental or theoretical contributions to condensed matter physics. An eligible candidate must have performed their research primarily with a Canadian Institution.

References

External links
 Bertram Brockhouse, the Triple-axis Spectrometer, and Neutron Spectroscopy , from the Office of Scientific and Technical Information, United States Department of Energy
  including the Nobel Lecture, December 8, 1994 Slow Neutron Spectroscopy and the Grand Atlas of the Physical World

1918 births
2003 deaths
Scientists from Lethbridge
Spectroscopists
Canadian nuclear physicists
University of Toronto alumni
University of British Columbia Faculty of Science alumni
Academic staff of McMaster University
Nobel laureates in Physics
Canadian Nobel laureates
Fellows of the Royal Society of Canada
Fellows of the American Physical Society
Companions of the Order of Canada
Canadian Fellows of the Royal Society
Oliver E. Buckley Condensed Matter Prize winners
20th-century Canadian scientists
Members of the Royal Swedish Academy of Sciences